In the National Collegiate Athletic Association (NCAA), the statistic for total games played in Division I men's basketball helps opposing coaches to monitor the extent that a particular player is used on a team.  By definition, a player has "played in a game" when he enters the contest via substitution or by starting the contest.  All that is required is that he is one of the five players for a team on the court for a minimal time of one second according to the game clock.

As of the end of the 2021–22 season, the all-time leader in games played is Jordan Bohannon, who played six seasons at Iowa and appeared in 179 games. Bohannon benefited from two special provisions of NCAA rules that allowed him to play in more than the standard four seasons.

Normally, the only way for a player to play in more than four NCAA seasons is to qualify for a "medical redshirt", officially known by the NCAA as a "hardship waiver". To be eligible, a player must have participated in fewer than one third of his team's scheduled games in that season, and cannot have participated in any games in the second half of the season. Bohannon received a medical redshirt in 2019–20, a season in which he played 10 games. Several other players on the career leaders list benefited from this rule. Bohannon also benefited from a special NCAA eligibility waiver for the 2020–21 season, which was so heavily disrupted by COVID-19 that the NCAA announced it would not count that season against any player's period of eligibility. He chose to play a final season in 2021–22.

Five other members of the career leaders list have played in six seasons:
 Jalen Coleman-Lands of Kansas, who started play at Illinois in 2015–16 and transferred to DePaul, sitting out the 2017–18 season due to then-current NCAA transfer rules. He suffered a season-ending injury in 2018–19 after playing nine games and received a medical redshirt, playing a full 2019–20 season at DePaul. Coleman-Lands then received a rare sixth season of eligibility for 2020–21, playing at Iowa State, and took advantage of the COVID-19 waiver and transferred to Kansas.
 Aaron Cook Jr., who began his career at Southern Illinois in 2016–17 and suffered a season-ending injury in 2019–20 after playing six games. After graduating in 2020, he transferred to Gonzaga for the 2020–21 season, and then took advantage of the COVID-19 waiver and transferred to Georgia.
 John Fulkerson, who played his entire career at Tennessee. He started his college career in 2016–17 and suffered a season-ending injury in his 10th game of that season, receiving a medical redshirt. Fulkerson chose to play for a sixth season in 2021–22 following the COVID-19 waiver.
 Justin Kier of Arizona, who began his career at George Mason in 2016–17 and played four seasons, suffered a season-ending injury in his senior season in 2019–20 after playing in nine games. After graduating from George Mason he transferred to Georgia for what would have been his final season of eligibility, but then took advantage of the COVID-19 waiver to transfer again to Arizona for 2021–22.
 Grant Golden of Richmond, who suffered a season-ending injury in his freshman season of 2016–17, played in only nine games that year, then took advantage of the COVID-19 waiver which allowed him to play a rare sixth eligible season in 2021–22.

Key

Top 25 games played leaders

Includes ties for 25th. Accurate as of games played through the 2021–22 season.

Leaders without COVID-19 waiver 
The overall top 25 is completely occupied by players who were active in the 2020–21 season and benefited from the COVID-19 waiver. The last players eligible to take advantage of this waiver will not complete their college eligibility until 2024–25, not counting any potential medical redshirt season in 2021–22 or later. For this reason, a separate list consisting solely of players who did not benefit from the waiver is being maintained.

Footnotes

References
General

 
Specific

NCAA Division I men's basketball statistical leaders